Yeo Chang-gu (born March 27, 1996), better known by his stage name Yeo One, is a South Korean singer and actor. He debuted as a vocalist in a South Korean boy group Pentagon in October 2016. Aside from group activities as singer, he has also starred in various television dramas.

Early life 
Yeo One was born on March 27, 1996, in Daejeon, South Korea. He was a member of a school band and actively participated in band competitions.

Career

Pre-debut 
In December 2013, Yeo One participated in a special dance performance alongside future bandmates Hui, E'Dawn, and Kino at the KBS Song Festival. In 2014, Yeo One appeared in G.NA's "Secret" music video and promotional activities. In July 2015, he acted in Beast's Son Dong-woon's "Kimishika" music video. In August 2015, he modeled alongside Hyuna for the fashion brand Clride.n.

2016–present: Debut with Pentagon and solo activities 
He took part on Mnet's reality survival program, Pentagon Maker, which aired online through Mnet's digital content brand M2. On October 10, 2016, he made his debut as a member of Pentagon on Mnet's M Countdown with the track "Gorilla" from their debut extended play, Pentagon. The song is described as a hip-hop song with magnificent, strong beats and masculine brass sound. During the show's filming, he made his acting debut with a lead role in web drama Spark as the leader of an idol group, Dexter. The series was a commercial success and attracted global fans.

In 2017, Yeo One was selected as the main character of KBS1 musical drama Joseon Beauty Pageant that set during the Joseon Dynasty's first beauty contest held. The drama also incorporates with traditional music with modern sensation and colorful images.

In 2019, Yeo One participated in reading the novel Youth, Beautiful Youth by Hermann Hesse through Naver Audio Clip Audiobook. He was confirmed to be the lead role in web drama, Welcome to the Witch Shop. The drama deals with fantasy elements that is based on the theme of witch shops that can only be visible to people with eager wishes.

In 2020, Yeo One returned to the small screen as a fictionalized version of himself on the TV Chosun entertainment drama Somehow Family. The show aired in March 2020, but was suspended after only two episodes due to the non-payment of staff. The show resumed filming in June but, due to scheduling conflicts, Yeo One was replaced by Shin Won-ho of Cross Gene. In August, Yeo One was cast as Nigel Bottom in the Korean adaptation of the comedy musical Something Rotten!. The play ran from August 7 to October 18. Later that year, he was the cover model for the September 2020 issue of Men's Health Korea.

In February 2021, Yeo One starred in the web drama Nickname Pine Leaf for the SBS YouTube channel , where he plays two different versions of himself: PD Yeo Chang-gu and Pentagon's Yeo One. 

In August 2022, he appeared in the KBS2 drama If You Wish Upon Me.

Discography

Other songs

Songwriting 

All credits are adapted from the Korea Music Copyright Association, unless stated otherwise.

Filmography

Television series

Web series

Variety shows

Narration

Music videos

Theater

Awards and Nominations

References

External links 
 
 
 

1996 births
Living people
Cube Entertainment artists
K-pop singers
South Korean male television actors
South Korean male web series actors
21st-century South Korean male singers
South Korean male idols
People from Daejeon
Pentagon (South Korean band) members
South Korean male singer-songwriters